His Ex Marks the Spot (1940) is the seventh short subject starring Buster Keaton made for Columbia Pictures.

Plot
Buster is married to his second wife Dorothy Appleby where he must pay his first wife Elsie Ames alimony leading to current financial stress.  To save the alimony payment, Buster invites his first wife and new boyfriend (Matt McHugh) to live with his current wife.  As you can imagine, there is a lot of comedic conflict.  To get the couple out and not have to pay alimony, a shotgun wedding ensues.

Cast
 Buster Keaton as the husband
 Dorothy Appleby as the second wife
 Elsie Ames as the first wife
 Matt McHugh as the boyfriend

See also
 Buster Keaton filmography

External links

 His Ex Marks the Spot at the International Buster Keaton Society

References

1940 films
1940 comedy films
Columbia Pictures short films
American black-and-white films
Films directed by Jules White
American comedy short films
1940s English-language films
1940s American films